Jan Baptist Jozef "Tiest" van Gestel (29 March 1881 – 9 February 1969) was an archer from the Netherlands. He was born in Goirle and died in Goirle.

He represented his native country at the 1920 Summer Olympics in Antwerp, Belgium. There he won the gold medal in the Men's Team Event (28 m), alongside Joep Packbiers, Piet de Brouwer, Driekske van Bussel, Janus van Merrienboer, Jo van Gastel, Janus Theeuwes, and Theo Willems.

References

External links
 profile

1881 births
1969 deaths
Dutch male archers
Archers at the 1920 Summer Olympics
Olympic archers of the Netherlands
Olympic gold medalists for the Netherlands
People from Goirle
Sportspeople from North Brabant
Olympic medalists in archery
Medalists at the 1920 Summer Olympics